Excel Maritime Carriers Ltd. is a shipping company specializing in the transport of dry bulk cargo such as iron ore, coal and grains, as well as bauxite, fertilizers and steel products.  As of May 2009, it is the largest bulk carrier by DWT of any U.S.-listed company. Approximately one-third of all seaborne trade is dry bulk related. Excel Maritime was a component of the NYSE Composite Index and the PHLX Marine Shipping Index. The stock has been de-listed from the exchanges as per their rules of listing

Bankruptcy 
Excel Maritime Carriers Ltd. filed for a pre-negotiated chapter 11 case on July 1, 2013. The bondholders, unsatisfied with the terms originally proposed by Excel, reached an agreement in late November 2013. The agreement was reached and ratified on January 27, 2014 with Excel expecting to emerge from chapter 11 in mid-February 2014. Upon completion of the restructuring process, the company's total pre-petition debt of $920 million will be reduced to approximately $300 million. Gabriel Panayotides, Chairman of the Board, together with the other members of Excel's management team, will continue to lead the company.

Headquarters 
The company is incorporated under the laws of the Republic of Liberia and has headquarters in Athens, Greece. Its registered office is in Hamilton, Bermuda. It is a holding company composed of separate wholly owned subsidiaries for each vessel which are incorporated in Liberia, the Marshall Islands, and Cyprus. The technical management of the fleet is undertaken by Maryville Maritime Inc., based in Piraeus, Greece, and is also a wholly owned subsidiary. Subsidiary Excel Management Ltd. has been contracted to provide brokering services for the company's vessels.

American Stock Exchange 
The company was first listed on the AMEX and NASDAQ in February 1989 under the name B&H Maritime.  In October 1997 B&H, which had ceased operations and disposed of its assets, was acquired and re-listed on the AMEX in 1998 as Excel Maritime Carriers Ltd.  The company was first listed on the NYSE on September 15, 2005.

The stock was de-listed from the NYSE as per their rules of listing

OTC trading of the stock under the symbol EXMCQ was halted on Friday February 14, at 12:23

Current President 
The president of the company is Gabriel Panayotides who has been chairman of the board since February 1998.  The former CEO Stamatis Molaris, CEO of Quintana from January 2005 to April 2008, resigned on February 23, 2009.  Prior to that, the CEO was Christopher Georgakis (former CEO of Oceanaut) who resigned in February 2008.  In August 2008, Mr. Georgakis filed litigation (still pending as of May 2009) claiming a breach of his stock option agreement along with charges of defamation.

Recent Acquisitions 
On January 29, 2008 the company agreed to acquire Quintana Maritime for US$ 764 million in cash and 23.5 million common shares for a total of US$ 1.44 billion.  With the acquisition, the company more than doubled the number of vessels it owns, acquiring 5 Capesize, 14 Kamsarmax and 11 Panamax carriers.  In addition, it inherited newbuilding contracts for 7 Capesize vessels with estimated delivery in 2010.  As of October 2009, the company expects to take delivery of only 2 of these and will share 50% ownership with external parties on one of them.  No deposits were forfeited for the 5 vessels not delivered.  Following the acquisition, 14 of the company's Kamsarmax vessels and 3 Panamax vessels were placed on time charters to Bunge.  Along with the acquisition, the company entered into a US$ 1 billion term loan and a US$ 400 million revolving loan at LIBOR + 1.25% (hedged with swap agreements at ~5%) which allowed it to refinance most of its loans.

Revenue 
The company earns the majority of its revenue from spot and time charters of its vessels.  The spot rate is largely dependent upon the Baltic Dry Index which reflects the current supply and demand for dry bulk vessels.  Longer-term charter contracts provide stable revenues which are not subject to the same volatility of spot rates.  In 2008, the company derived approximately 23% of its revenue from a single charterer, Bunge.  Upon chartering, the charterer is free to trade the vessel worldwide, so geographic deployment statistics are not reported.

By being incorporated in Liberia prior to the enactment of a 2004 tax law (retroactive to 2001) which repealed the tax exemption for non-resident corporations, the company is subject to prior law and a court ruled that they would continue to be exempt from Liberian income tax of 35%.  The company must pay up to 2% US income tax on international voyages that either start or end in the US.

Notable events

Valuation 
As of November 2009, the company owns and operates a fleet of 47 vessels comprising 5 Capesize, 14 Kamsarmax, 21 Panamax, 2 Supramax, and 5 Handymax vessels with a total carrying capacity of approximately 3.9 million deadweight tonnage. 2 additional Capesize vessels will be delivered in 2010.  The vessels are depreciated over a useful life of 28 years and calculated to have a scrap value of $200 per light weight ton.  The current market value of such vessels is estimated by various reporting agencies.

The price for bulk vessels has declined dramatically within the last few years.  In November 2007, a newbuild Capesize vessel sold for as much as $150M.  In November 2009, newbuild Capes were delivered for as low as $59M and there were reports of prices as low as $45M.

The company owns an 18.9% stake in Oceanaut which was incorporated in May 2006.  In February 2009, a vote to dissolve Oceanaut was undertaken.  Liquidation proceeds for Excel Maritime should be approximately $5 million.

Factors affecting net revenue include the global supply and demand for vessels captured by the BDI; fleet utilitzation rates; sales and scrappage of ships owned by the company.  Chinese demand for iron ore and coal play an important role in overall dry bulk demand.  Chinese New Year (late January) production halts may be a seasonal factor to consider.  Port congestion, which ties up vessels from being available for other charters, can also influence vessel rates.  The company also must rely upon their charters not to breach their contracts.  In February 2009, one charterer unilaterally decided to pay 50% of their contracted rate and other charterers tried to renegotiate their rates lower.

Some factors that affect the net expenses of the company include crew/employee salaries, training and benefits; insurance; interest rates; dry docking for inspection, repairs and maintenance; spares; lubricants; victualing; property leases; compliance with international maritime and environmental laws; taxes; brokering commissions; bunkers; port charges. As of January 31, 2014 this company is in bankruptcy.

Equity 
The company had 78,863,299 shares outstanding as of November 2009.  The company largely held by the chairman and his family who beneficially own approximately 33.5M shares plus warrants to purchase 5.5M at $3.50.

Debt

References

NYSE

News

Yahoo

Others

External links 
 Excel Maritime Spreadsheet

Companies listed on the New York Stock Exchange
Shipping companies of Greece
Companies based in Athens